Mickleburgh is a surname. Notable people with the surname include:

Jaik Mickleburgh (born 1990), English cricketer
John Mickleburgh (c. 1692 – 1756), English chemist